Thomas Robert Anderson (born 2 September 1993) is an English footballer who plays as a defender for  club Doncaster Rovers.

Having been associated with Burnley from the age of seven, he turned professional at the club in May 2012. He spent the first half of the 2012–13 season on loan at Barrow, and had a brief stay on loan at Hyde in the second half of the campaign. He joined FC Halifax Town and Lincoln City on loan in November 2013 and September 2014 respectively, before making his debut in the English Football League on loan at Carlisle United in November 2014. He spent the second half of the 2015–16 season and the whole of the 2016–17 campaign on loan at Chesterfield. He joined Port Vale on loan for the first half of the 2017–18 season, and then was loaned to Doncaster Rovers for the second half of the season, before he joined Doncaster Rovers permanently in May 2018.

Career

Burnley
Anderson started his career in the Centre of Excellence at Burnley, joining the club as a seven-year-old. He progressed through the Centre of Excellence and went on to join the under-18 side, signing a two-year scholarship in the summer of 2010. He was captain of the Burnley side that reached the semi-finals of the 2011–12 FA Youth Cup, however he missed the tail end of the season due to a bout of Infectious mononucleosis. In May 2012, on completion of his scholarship he signed his first professional contract on a one-year deal.

Conference loans
In August 2012, he signed for Conference Premier side Barrow on loan until January 2013, along with fellow Burnley player Joe Jackson. He made his first-team debut in a 0–0 draw with AFC Telford United at Holker Street on 11 August. He established himself as a first-team regular as the "Bluebirds" struggled towards the bottom end of the table. Barrow manager David Bayliss looked into extending his loan deal but Anderson returned to Burnley in January, having made 21 appearances for the club. In January 2013 upon his return to Turf Moor, he made first-team bench for the 2–0 away win at Millwall, remaining an unused substitute.

A month later he joined Conference Premier side Hyde on a one-month loan deal. His debut came against Kidderminster Harriers in a 4–0 away defeat on 16 February, when he replaced Josh Brizell as a second-half substitute. His first start for the club came three days later in a 1–0 defeat to Mansfield Town at Ewen Fields. He returned to Burnley late in February, having only made four appearances for Scott McNiven's "Tigers", after his loan was cut short due to a knee ligament injury he picked up in a 5–1 defeat at Alfreton Town. In April 2013, he signed a new one-year contract extension with Burnley despite having not recovered from his knee injury.

In November 2013, having recovered from his injury, he signed for Conference Premier side FC Halifax Town on loan until January 2014. He played in a West Riding County Cup game defeat at Harrogate Town on 4 December, partnering 16-year old Jack Bradle at centre-back, and after the game was praised by manager Neil Aspin. He made his league debut for the club three days later in a 4–3 defeat to Woking at The Shay. It proved to be his only league appearance for the "Shaymen" as he struggled to get into the team due to the good form of other players, and he returned to Burnley in January.

In July 2014, he signed another one-year extension with Burnley following the club's promotion to the Premier League. In September 2014, he was sent out on loan again, joining Conference Premier side Lincoln City on a one-month loan deal. He went straight into Gary Simpson's first-team, making his debut in a 1–0 defeat at Aldershot Town on 20 September. He scored his first senior goal ten days later in a 1–1 draw with Gateshead at Sincil Bank, scoring the opener with a header. In October 2014, he returned to Burnley having made six appearances for the "Imps" after a loan extension could not be agreed between the two clubs.

Carlisle United loan
Later in the month he joined League Two club Carlisle United on an initial one-month loan deal. He made his debut for the "Cumbrians" in a 3–0 defeat at Portsmouth on 1 November, and earned praise from boss Keith Curle despite the heavy defeat. His loan was extended for a further month after he impressed in his first four appearances for the "Blues". In January 2015, he returned to Burnley following the 2–1 defeat to Newport County, having made nine appearances during his stay at Brunton Park.

Chesterfield loans
On 1 February 2016, he joined League One side Chesterfield on loan until the end of the 2015–16 season. Speaking the following month, manager Danny Wilson said that "he has made a big, big difference to us at the back" and that "nobody notices him because it's just been so seamless with what he's been doing". At the end of the season, he returned to Burnley having played 18 games for the "Spireites", who posted an 18th-place finish.

On 31 August 2016, Anderson re-signed for Chesterfield on loan until the end of the 2016–17 season. He was named on the EFL team of the week for his performance in a 0–0 draw at Oldham Athletic on 10 September. On 6 December, he was sent off for the first time in his career for a foul on Aaron Morley in a 2–0 EFL Trophy victory at Rochdale. On 14 February, he scored an injury-time equalizer to secure a point in a 1–1 draw away at relegation rivals Gillingham. However four days later he received his second red card of the season in a 2–1 defeat by Bury at the Proact Stadium ; after the match manager Gary Caldwell said that "you're a defender, it's going to happen". On 17 April, he scored a late consolation goal in a 3–1 defeat at Scunthorpe United, a result which relegated Chesterfield into League Two. He was a regular starter for Chesterfield, making 39 appearances in all competitions across the campaign.

Port Vale loan
On 31 August 2017, Anderson joined newly-relegated League Two side Port Vale on a season-long loan. He said he was looking forward to linking up again with defensive coach Chris Morgan, who had previously coached at Chesterfield. He made his debut for the "Valiants" on 12 September as captain Antony Kay was dropped, and Anderson was praised for his performance despite the team suffering a 2–0 defeat at Luton Town. Despite being signed to the "Valiants" by Michael Brown, Anderson initially struggled for games and only actually went on to establish himself as an important part of the first-team under new manager Neil Aspin, forming an effective centre-back partnership with Nathan Smith. However he was recalled by Burnley on 29 January, much to Aspin's surprise and disappointment.

Doncaster Rovers
On 31 January 2018, Anderson joined League One side Doncaster Rovers on loan until the end of the 2017–18 season. After scoring twice in Doncaster's 3–0 victory over Fleetwood Town at the Keepmoat Stadium on 17 February, he made the EFL Team of the Week. However he was sidelined for two months after fracturing his cheekbone in a 2–1 defeat at Rotherham United seven days later; "Donny" manager Darren Ferguson said that "It's a bad injury but it could've been worse in many ways. He's a tough boy, he'll get on with it". He signed a two-year contract with Doncaster on 17 May 2018. He scored two goals in 33 appearances during the 2018–19 season, having battled with Joe Wright and loanee Paul Downing to partner Andy Butler in central defence; manager Grant McCann had signed Downing in the January transfer window.

He was sent off for a foul on Matt Bloomfield in a 1–0 defeat at Wycombe Wanderers on 23 November 2019. He signed a new contract on New Year's Day to keep him at the club until summer 2022, and was described as a "tower of strength" by manager Darren Moore. The 2019–20 campaign was described as a "breakout season" for Anderson by Doncaster Free Press reporter Liam Hoden, who wrote that he had "rarely been unduly troubled by an opposition forward" and was unmatched in aerial duels whilst his positioning skills had greatly improved.

Anderson performed excellently throughout the 2020–21 campaign, improving his distribution skills whilst maintaining his tackling and positional ability. Speaking in March, he said that he wanted the team to get interim manager Andy Butler's career off to a good start as he was well liked and respected in the dressing room. He scored two goals in 51 games as Doncaster posted a 14th-place finish, though admitted that veteran midfielder James Coppinger was right to question the squad's desire after a late play-off push was ended with a run of just two wins in 14 games.

Speaking in July 2021, manager Richie Wellens confirmed that Anderson and Ro-Shaun Williams would be Doncaster's starting centre-back pairing for the new season, hailing Anderson as the "best centre half in the league". He went on to tell his squad to emulate Anderson in his determination to stick to the basics. However Anderson missed the second half of the 2021–22 season, with new manager Gary McSheffrey confirming that a plantar fascia injury in his foot kept causing him to break down. Nevertheless, the club activated an option to extend his expiring contract for a further year as they adjusted to life in League Two following relegation.

Following the departure of Adam Clayton in January 2023, Anderson was made first-team captain.

Style of play
The Sheffield Star described Anderson as a "straightforward 'kick it and head it' defender". Speaking in March 2017, Burnley manager Sean Dyche praised his mentality, will and desire.

Career statistics

References

External links

1993 births
Living people
Footballers from Burnley
English footballers
Association football defenders
Burnley F.C. players
Barrow A.F.C. players
Hyde United F.C. players
FC Halifax Town players
Lincoln City F.C. players
Carlisle United F.C. players
Chesterfield F.C. players
Port Vale F.C. players
Doncaster Rovers F.C. players
National League (English football) players
English Football League players